Huining County is a county in the east of Gansu Province, bordering Ningxia to the east. It is under the administration of Baiyin City and located at its southeast end. Its postal code is 730700, and its population in 1999 was 569,599 people.

In October 1936, the Red Army met in Huining to celebrate the end of the Long March.

Administrative divisions
Huining County is divided to 24 towns, 3 townships  and 1 ethnic township.
Towns

*County seat
Townships
 Dangjiaxian Township()
 Baliwan Township()
 Tugaoshan Township()

Ethnic townships
 Xintianbao Hui Township()

Climate

Transport 
China National Highway 312

See also
 List of administrative divisions of Gansu

References

  Official website (Chinese)

County-level divisions of Gansu
Baiyin